Kibo may refer to:

 Kibō (ISS module), Japanese Experiment Module (JEM), component of the International Space Station
 Kibo, a volcanic cone forming the main summit of Mount Kilimanjaro
 An alias of James Parry, who as "Kibo" became a cult figure on Usenet in the early 1990s for posting numerous humorous messages
 Kibo (spider), a genus of jumping spiders
 Kibō no Tō, a political party in Japan
 Board game record

See also 
 Kybo, scouting term for an outhouse